Pomaderris notata, commonly known as McPherson Range pomaderris, is a species of flowering plant in the family Rhamnaceae and is endemic to eastern Australia. It is a shrub with woolly-hairy stems, elliptic leaves, and cream-coloured flowers.

Description

Taxonomy
Pomaderris notata was first formally described in 1945 by Stanley Thatcher Blake in The Queensland Naturalist, from specimens he collected in the McPherson Range in 1945. The specific epithet (nitidula) means "marked".

Distribution and habitat
McPherson Range pomaderris grows in heath, scrub or rainforest in rocky places at higher altitudes, mainly in south-eastern Queensland but also in a few isolated populations in northern New South Wales.

Conservation status
This pomaderris is listed as "vulnerable" under the New South Wales Government Biodiversity Conservation Act 2016.

References

Flora of New South Wales
notata
Flora of Queensland
Plants described in 1945
Taxa named by Stanley Thatcher Blake